Zulfiia Sabitova (born 6 May 1993) is a Russian slalom canoeist who has competed at the international level since 2012.

She won a bronze medal in the C1 team event at the 2021 World Championships in Bratislava

References

External links

Living people
Russian female canoeists
1993 births
Medalists at the ICF Canoe Slalom World Championships